Daniel Rhys Ellison (born 6 March 1966) is a former New Zealand rugby union player.

Career
After playing for Otago while at university, Ellison debuted for the Mooloos in 1990. He played in 60 games for Otago, 90 games for Waikato, over 20 games for the Maori All Blacks and played in three All Blacks Trials. In 1993, with Waikato, Ellison helped to beat the touring British and Irish Lions and to win the Ranfurly Shield. After a year in Japan, he joined Irish club side Munster, playing for them and Shannon RFC from 1997 until 2000.

Outside of rugby
Ellison graduated with a law degree in and was admitted to the bar in 1994. He is qualified to practice law in both New Zealand and Ireland and is a member of the New Zealand Law Society, Auckland District Law Society, The Irish Law society, the Zealand Society of Notary Publics and the World Society of Notary Publics. He is now the Principal of Rhys Ellison Law.

Family
Thomas Ellison is Rhys' great-uncle. Thomas was the first Maori to graduate from a NZ University with a law degree and the first All Black Captain. While in Ireland, Rhys met his wife, Karen, and they have two sons; Jake and Tristan. They now live in New Zealand.

References

External links
Munster Profile
RugbyHistory Profile

1966 births
Living people
New Zealand rugby union players
People educated at Hamilton Boys' High School
Munster Rugby players
Rugby union wings
Shannon RFC players
Waikato rugby union players
Otago rugby union players
New Zealand Māori rugby union players
Māori All Blacks players
University of Otago alumni
University of Waikato alumni
Rugby union players from Waikato
Rhys